The Tanana Valley Railroad (TVRR) was a  narrow gauge railroad that operated in the Tanana Valley of Alaska from 1905 to about 1917. A portion of the railroad later became part of the Alaska Railroad.

History 
The TVRR was incorporated as the Tanana Mines Railway in 1904, construction on the first section started and completed in 1905. The main speaker at the gala golden spike ceremony was Judge Wickersham and Mrs. Isabelle Barnett accepted the golden spike.  The builder was Falcon Joslin who was called the "Harriman of the North". It was renamed the Tanana Valley Railroad in 1907. The company declared bankruptcy and was liquidated c. 1917. The U.S. government purchased the railroad in June 1917, and the section between Fairbanks and Happy was converted to dual gauge by the Alaskan Engineering Commission, in order to complete a  railroad line from Seward to Fairbanks. This line became the Alaska Railroad (Alaska RR) in 1923. The Alaska RR continued to operate the former TVRR narrow-gauge line as the Chatanika Branch, until decommissioning it in 1930.

Preservation 
In 1922, the railroad's Engine No. 1, the first steam locomotive in Fairbanks and the Yukon, was retired. Its restoration was begun in 1997 and completed in 2000. As of 2011 it is still being steamed up several times a year. A small museum for the engine was built in 2005 in Pioneer Park. On July 20, 2019, Engine #1 was a star attraction when it operated on its 120th birthday at a reenactment of the TVRR's Golden Spike ceremony.

References 

 Friends of the Tanana Valley Railroad. "History of the Tanana Valley Railroad." Accessed 2011-11-14.
 Friends of the Tanana Valley Railroad news archive

External links 

 Photo of a battery-electric car of the Tanana Valley Railroad

Defunct Alaska railroads
Transportation in Fairbanks North Star Borough, Alaska
Narrow gauge railroads in Alaska
3 ft gauge railways in the United States
Alaska Railroad
Tanana Athabaskans